Loop 494 is a state highway loop in the Greater Houston area of Texas.

Route description
Loop 494 begins at I-69/US 59 just south of the Harris–Montgomery county line. The route travels northward, paralleling the freeway to its west. It passes the community of Kingwood and the unincorporated area of Porter before reaching New Caney, where it has a brief concurrency with FM 1485. Shortly thereafter, it connects once again with I-69/US 59, where the Loop 494 designation ends.

History
Loop 494 was designated on October 2, 1970 after US 59 was moved to the extension of the Eastex Freeway into Montgomery County.

Major intersections

References

494
Transportation in Harris County, Texas
Transportation in Montgomery County, Texas
U.S. Route 59
Roads in Houston